Jean Chrétien, Baron Baud  (1789–1859) was Governor-General of the Dutch East Indies from 1833 until 1836.

He was born in The Hague on 23 October 1789. He was a civil servant and politician who served under  William I and William II of the Netherlands.  He sped through the ranks of the civil service until he reached the post of Vice President of the Council for the Dutch East Indies. Following Johannes van den Bosch, as acting Governor-General and, later, Minister for the Colonies, he was a strong defender of the Dutch Colonial policy, the cultuurstelsel, which required a certain amount of profitable crops to be dedicated to export.

He was succeed in 1836 by Dominique Jacques de Eerens. He became Minister of the Marine in 1840 and Minister for the Colonies from that year until 1848. After 1848 he was for a few years a conservative member for Rotterdam of the House of Representatives. He died in The Hague on 27 June 1859.

References

External links 
 

1789 births
1859 deaths
Barons of the Netherlands
Dutch civil servants
Dutch members of the Dutch Reformed Church
Governors-General of the Dutch East Indies
Members of the House of Representatives (Netherlands)
Ministers of Colonial Affairs of the Netherlands
Ministers of the Navy of the Netherlands
Ministers of State (Netherlands)
People from The Hague
Dutch people of Swiss descent